Bodmin St Mary's was an electoral division of Cornwall in the United Kingdom which returned one member to sit on Cornwall Council between 2013 and 2021. It was abolished at the 2021 local elections, being succeeded by Bodmin St Mary's and St Leonard. It was also previously a ward of Cornwall County Council (as Bodmin St Marys) from 1985 to 2009.

Cornwall Council

Extent
The Cornwall Council division of Bodmin St Mary's represented the west of Bodmin, the hamlet of Dunmere and parts of the hamlet of St Lawrence (which was shared with Lanivet and Blisland), covering a total of 342 hectares.

Election results

2017 election

2013 election

Cornwall County Council

Election results

2005 election

2001 election

1997 election

1993 election

1989 election

1985 election

References

Bodmin
Electoral divisions of Cornwall Council
Electoral divisions of Cornwall County Council